Teshigahara (written: 勅使河原) is a Japanese surname. Notable people with the surname include:

, Japanese film director
, Japanese flower arranger

Japanese-language surnames